St. Benedict's Catholic School is a historic school building located at 524 1st Street West in Roundup, Montana. The school was built in 1920-21 to serve the children of Roundup's Catholic immigrant community. Coal production, an oil boom, and homesteading all drove economic and population growth in Roundup during the 1910s, and many of the city's new residents were European immigrants. The city's newly established Catholic community built the school toward the end of Roundup's building boom. Architect John H. Grant, who served as the city's only resident architect, designed the two-story brick building. Various groups of nuns served as the school's teachers, with different orders replacing the previous one every few years; when a new order could not be found to replace a departing order in 1950, the school closed for good.

The building was added to the National Register of Historic Places on July 21, 1988. It is currently being used as the Musselshell Valley Historical Museum.

References

School buildings on the National Register of Historic Places in Montana
National Register of Historic Places in Musselshell County, Montana
Neoclassical architecture in Montana
1921 establishments in Montana
History museums in Montana
School buildings completed in 1921
Catholic schools in Montana